Deori is one of the 230 Vidhan Sabha (Legislative Assembly) constituencies of Madhya Pradesh state in central India. This constituency came into existence in 1957, as one of the Vidhan Sabha constituencies of Damoh Madhya Pradesh state.

Overview
Deori (constituency number 38) is one of the 8 Vidhan Sabha constituencies located in Sagar district. This constituency presently covers the entire Keshli and Deori kalan - tehsils of the district.

Deori is part of Damoh Lok Sabha constituency along with eight other Vidhan Sabha segments, namely, Rehli and Banda in this district, Malhara in Chhatarpur district and Pathariya, Damoh, Jabera and Hatta in Damoh district.

Members of Legislative Assembly

Election Results

2013 results 

Source:

See also
 Deori

References

Sagar district
Assembly constituencies of Madhya Pradesh